The Military ranks of Somaliland are the military insignia used by the Somaliland Armed Forces, whose rank insignia combine those used by United Kingdom, which maintained colonial possessions in this country. Rank insignia follow thus the British pattern, but has four warrant officer ranks following the US model. The highest rank is lieutenant general, currently there has been no promotion to the rank of lieutenant general rank. Somaliland does not have an air force.

February 2, 2013 all armed forces in Somaliland are officially granted military ranks.

Commissioned officers
The rank insignia for commissioned officers for the army, navy, police and custodial corps respectively.

Enlisted
The rank insignia for enlisted personnel for the army, navy, police and custodial corps respectively.

References

 

Somaliland
Military of Somaliland